Federico Scappi (born 13 May 1994) is an Italian footballer who plays as a defender.

Career
Born in Guastalla, the Province of Reggio-Emilia, Emilia region, Scappi started his career at Reggio for Reggiana. On 27 July 2010 he was signed by Serie A defending champion of 2010, Lombardy club Inter in temporary deal for €30,000 with option to purchase half of the registration rights. Scappi was a player of Inter U17 team in 2010–11 season. In June the loan deal was renewed for €50,000. Scappi spent another season for Inter U18 team in 2011–12 Berretti League. Scappi returned to Emilia for its U19 reserve on 1 July 2012, despite also in Berretti League. He also played 9 times for the first team in 2012–13 Lega Pro Prima Divisione.

Scappi also represented Lega Pro U19 team (born 1993 team) against representative of Serie D and Italy U19 (born 1994) during 2012–13 season.

On 10 July 2013 Scappi was signed by another Serie A club Chievo with Valerio Anastasi moved to opposite direction. Scappi also returned to Reggio on the same day along with Matteo Solini from Chievo in temporary deals. Scappi was a player of the reserve as overage player in 2013–14 season. On 20 June 2014 Reggiana bought back Scappi.

However, on 20 August Scappi joined Eccellenza Emilia–Romagna team Lentigione. Lentigione won promotion to Serie D in summer 2015.

Scappi played in the fifth and sixth tier (Eccellenza and Promozione) for the next 4 seasons.

On 30 July 2019 he signed with Serie C club Rimini. On 17 January 2020, his Rimini contract was terminated by mutual consent.

References

External links
 AIC profile (data by football.it) 

1994 births
People from Guastalla
Footballers from Emilia-Romagna
Living people
Italian footballers
Association football defenders
A.C. Reggiana 1919 players
A.C. ChievoVerona players
Rimini F.C. 1912 players
Serie C players
Sportspeople from the Province of Reggio Emilia